is a Japanese actor.

Career
Sasano has appeared in Kiyoshi Kurosawa's films Bright Future (2003) and Before We Vanish (2017). He also appeared in Amir Naderi's 2011 film Cut.

Filmography

Film
 Tora-san's Island Encounter (1985)
 Final Take (1986)
 A Class to Remember (1993)
 The Geisha House (1999)
 Keiho (1999)
 Last Scene (2002)
 Bright Future (2003)
 No One's Ark (2003)
 The Hidden Blade (2004)
 Ame Yori Setsunaku (2005)
 Metro ni Notte (2006)
 Love and Honor (2006)
 Nezu no Ban (2006)
 Tsuribaka Nisshi 17 (2006)
 Kabei: Our Mother (2008)
 10 Promises to My Dog (2008)
 Departures (2008)
 Mt. Tsurugidake (2009)
 Dear Doctor (2009)
 Asahiyama Zoo Story: Penguins in the Sky (2009)
 Surely Someday (2010)
 About Her Brother (2010)
 Wasao (2011)
 Cut (2011)
 Hara-Kiri: Death of a Samurai (2011)
 Slapstick Brothers (2011)
 Tenchi: The Samurai Astronomer (2012)
 Thermae Romae (2012)
 125 Years Memory (2015), Mayor Sato
 Creepy (2016)
 Golden Orchestra (2016)
 What a Wonderful Family! (2016)
 Before We Vanish (2017)
 Recall (2018)
 What a Wonderful Family! 3: My Wife, My Life (2018)
 Life in Overtime (2018)
 Masquerade Hotel (2019)
 Tora-san, Wish You Were Here (2019), Gozen-sama
 Haruka no Sue (2019)
 The 47 Ronin in Debt (2019), Ochiai Yozaemon
 They Say Nothing Stays the Same (2019)
 Labyrinth of Cinema (2020)
 Wife of a Spy (2020), Dr. Nozaki
 The Devil Wears Jūnihitoe (2020)
 Nishinari Goro's 400 Million Yen (2021)
Riverside Mukolitta (2022)
 What to Do with the Dead Kaiju? (2022), the Minister of Finance
 Yudō (2023)
 We Make Antiques! Osaka Dreams (2023)
 Nemesis: The Movie (2023)

Television
 Aoi (2000) – Torii Mototada
 Tenchijin (2009) – Toyotomi Hideyoshi
 Shinzanmono (2010)
 Man of Destiny (2012) – Takeo Fukude
 Samurai Rebellion (2013)
 Keisei Saimin no Otoko Part 1 (2015) – Inoue Kaoru
 Shuriken Sentai Ninninger (2015) – Yoshitaka Igasaki
 Nobunaga Moyu (2016) – Yoshida Kanemi
 Chiisana Hashi de (2017)
 Ishitsubute (2017)
 Brother and Sister (2018)
 Wife of a Spy (2020) – Dr. Nozaki
 Love You as the World Ends (2021) – Masaomi Uwajima
 Nakamura Nakazo: Shusse no Kizahashi (2021)
 My Ex-Boyfriend's Last Will (2022) – Genta Murayama

Awards

References

External links
 
 

1948 births
Living people
Actors from Hyōgo Prefecture
Japanese male film actors
Japanese male television actors
Nihon University alumni
20th-century Japanese male actors
21st-century Japanese male actors